"Si tu pars" is a song performed by French singer M. Pokora. It serves as the fourth single from Pokora's fifth studio album À la poursuite du bonheur. It was written by Pokora, Bina and Matthieu Mendès and produced by Matthieu Mendès.

Track listing 
Digital download
 Si tu pars (radio version) - 	3:42

Charts

Notes

2012 singles
M. Pokora songs
Songs written by M. Pokora
Songs written by Matthieu Mendès
2012 songs
EMI Records singles